The Lilly Brothers, (Bea Lilly, born Michael Burt Lilly, December 15, 1921 – September 18, 2005 and brother Everett Lilly, born July 1, 1924 – May 8, 2012) were bluegrass musicians born in Clear Creek, West Virginia. They have been credited with bringing bluegrass to New England and with influencing such future bluegrass artists as Peter Rowan, Joe Val and Bill Keith, among others.

Biography
Influenced by the traditional music they heard in their youth, Bea began playing the guitar and Everett the mandolin. In 1938, they made their radio debut on the Old Farm Hour show at WCHS in Charleston, West Virginia. Other radio works followed at WJLS in Beckley, West Virginia and on several other Southern radio stations during the 1940s. In 1945, they appeared on the Molly O'Day radio show at WNOX in Knoxville, Tennessee. In 1948, the brothers signed with the WWVA Jamboree in Wheeling, West Virginia as members of "Red Belcher's Kentucky Ridge Runners", but they quit two years later because of a financial dispute and the brothers retired temporarily. In 1951, Everett joined Flatt & Scruggs as mandolin player. The next year, in 1952, 'Tex' Logan, whom they had met at the WWVA Jamboree, persuaded the brothers to reunite.

The Lilly Brothers moved to Boston and formed a group called the "Confederate Mountaineers" who consisted of the brothers on guitar and mandolin, Logan on fiddle, and Don Stover on banjo. They performed on WCOP's Hayloft Jamboree and as a house band at local clubs such as the Plaza Bar, the Mohawk Ranch, and the Hillbilly Ranch. Soon, they were making records for the Folkways, Prestige and Event labels. Somewhere along the line they changed the group's name to the Lilly Brothers.

In the 1960s they appeared in concerts at several major colleges and at folk festivals. The personnel of the Lilly Brothers didn't change between 1952 and 1970 and is considered one of bluegrass music's most stable lineups. The death of Everett Lilly's son, Giles, in a car crash in 1970 brought to an end the brothers’ career in Boston and Everett left the town. For the remainder of the 1970s, the brothers would reunite on several occasions. In 1973 the Lilly Brothers made a tremendously successful tour of Japan, including the release of three live albums. The Lilly Brothers’ career was later chronicled in a 1979 documentary "True Facts in a Country Song". In the 1980s, as Bea retired, Everett and his son Mark played together in the group "Clear Creek Crossin'".

Everett Lilly continued to play and perform with his sons in a band called Everett Lilly and the Lilly Mountaineers until his death in 2012.

Afterwards
Joe Val once said of the Confederate Mountaineers’ influence on urban Massachusetts, Those guys hit on like a bombshell. Nobody’d ever heard anything like that before.

The Lilly Brothers’ singing has been described as rich, mountain-flavoured bluegrass and their brand of dynamic, no holds barred traditional bluegrass has been noted as haunting and earthy.

Inductions
 In 1986. the Lilly Brothers were inducted into the Massachusetts Country Music Hall of Fame and Don Stover was inducted the following year.
 On October 17, 2002, the Lilly Brothers and Don Stover were inducted into the International Bluegrass Music Hall of Fame.
 In November 2008, the Lilly Brothers were inducted into the West Virginia Music Hall of Fame.

Discography

78 RPM

Albums

Compilations and reissues

Video appearances

Footnotes

References
 Black, Bob (2005) Come Hither To Go Yonder, University of Illinois Press
 Carlin, Richard (2003) Country Music: A Biographical Dictionary, Taylor & Francis
 Carr, Joe – Munde, Alan (1996) Prairie Nights To Neon Lights: The Story of Country Music In West Texas, Texas Tech University Press
 Erbsen, Wayne (2003) Rural Roots of Bluegrass: Songs, Stories and History, Mel Bay Publications
 Jones, Loyal (2008) Country Music Humorists and Comedians, University of Illinois Press
 Wolff, Kurt – Duane, Orla (2000) Country Music: The Rough Guide, Rough Guides

External links 
 
 
Everett Lilly biography at IBMM
B Lilly biography at IBMM
Don Stover biography at Oldies.com

American bluegrass music groups
Musicians from West Virginia
Sibling musical duos